The 1980 Sacramento State Hornets football team represented California State University, Sacramento as a member of the Far Western Conference (FWC) during the 1980 NCAA Division II football season. Led by third-year head coach Bob Mattos, Sacramento State compiled an overall record of 3–7 with a mark of 1–4 in conference play, tying for fifth place the FWC. The team was outscored by its opponents 185 to 161 for the season. The Hornets played home games at Hornet Stadium in Sacramento, California.

Schedule

References

Sacramento State
Sacramento State Hornets football seasons
Sacramento State Hornets football